This is a list of Indian reservations and other tribal homelands in the United States. In Canada, the Indian reserve is a similar institution.

Federally recognized reservations
There are 326 Indian Reservations in the United States. Most of the tribal land base in the United States was set aside by the federal government as Native American Reservations.  In California, about half of its reservations are called rancherías. In New Mexico, most reservations are called Pueblos. In some western states, notably Nevada, there are Native American areas called Indian colonies. Populations are total census counts and include non-Native American people as well, sometimes making up a majority of the residents. The total population of all of them is 1,043,762.

Federally recognized trust lands

Alaska Native village statistical areas
Alaska Native Village Statistical Areas are geographical areas the United States Census Bureau uses to track demographic data. These statistical areas represent permanent or seasonal residences of Alaska natives. Specifically, they contain a significant proportion of persons who are either member of, or receiving services from a defining Alaska Native Village for at least one season of the year. Alaska Natives previously had many small reserves scattered around Alaska; however, all but one (the Annette Island Reserve of Tsimshian) were repealed with the passage of the Alaska Native Claims Settlement Act in 1971.

Hawaiian home lands

Oklahoma tribal statistical areas

(*) declared reservations under McGirt v. Oklahoma

State-recognized reservations 
A state designated American Indian reservation is the land area designated by a state for state-recognized American Indian tribes who lack federal recognition.

State designated tribal statistical areas
State Designated Tribal Statistical Areas are geographical areas the United States Census Bureau uses to track demographic data. These areas have a substantial concentration of members of tribes that are State recognized but not Federally recognized and do not have a reservation or off-reservation trust land.

Tribal designated statistical areas
A tribal designated statistical area is a statistical entity identified and delineated for the Census Bureau by a federally recognized American Indian tribe that does not currently have a federally established Indian reservation.

See also

United States
 List of federally recognized tribes
 List of federally recognized tribes by state
 State recognized tribes in the United States
 List of unrecognized tribes in the United States
 Native Americans in the United States
 List of Alaska Native tribal entities
 List of historical Indian reservations in the United States
 National Park Service Native American Heritage Sites
 Outline of United States federal Indian law and policy
 Off-reservation trust land
 Native Americans and reservation inequality

Canada
 List of First Nations governments
 List of First Nations peoples
 List of Indian reserves in Canada

References

Sources
 

Native American-related lists